Bowman Bay is an Arctic waterway in the Qikiqtaaluk Region, Nunavut, Canada. It is located in the Foxe Basin by northeastern Foxe Peninsula off Baffin Island.

Avifauna
During ornithologist J. Dewey Soper's 1928–31 Arctic expedition, he located the blue goose (C. c. caerulescens) nesting grounds on Bluegoose Plain by Bowman Bay.

Conservation
The Bowman Bay Wildlife Sanctuary was established in 1957. The Dewey Soper Migratory Bird Sanctuary stretches from Bowman Bay to the Koukdjuak River.

References

Bays of Baffin Island